Mighty Milky Way is an action puzzle video game for the Nintendo DSi. It is the second title after Mighty Flip Champs! in the Mighty series from WayForward Technologies. The game was released for download through DSiWare on May 9, 2011 in North America and May 27, 2011 in Europe.  It was the last game officially released for the Nintendo DS in Japan.

Due to no availability on other systems outside Nintendo DS and 3DS, Mighty Milky Way will be confirmed as a lost game in the Mighty series after the closure of Nintendo eShop in 2023. Other games in the series are still in circulation, including Mighty Flip Champs!, which is available on the PlayStation Network.

Gameplay
Mighty Milky Way tasks players with guiding Luna, a French-speaking extraterrestrial, safely towards a portal at the end of each level while avoiding enemies and electric barrels. Each level is filled with small planets, each with their own center of gravity, which Luna walks around clockwise at a speed controlled by the player. By kicking off of planets, in some cases destroying them, Luna can propel herself through space in a specific direction, sometimes swayed by a planet's gravity. Kicking off a planet also causes any enemies on it to fly off its orbit, which can be used to destroy other obstacles. By collecting pieces of candy, Luna can create additional planets to help her navigate difficult sections.

Reception and legacy

The game received "favorable" reviews according to the review aggregation website Metacritic. Reviewing for IGN, Lucas M. Thomas praised the game's unusual design, and described the game as challenging. Thomas said the game requires repeated attempts for each level but that "Mighty Milky Way's frustrations almost always feel like the good kind".

This game is the only one in the Mighty series that is extremely rare due to its sole availability on the Nintendo DS and 3DS, respectively. Because of the eShop’s closure on March 27, 2023, it will be classified as a lost game. However, it is only saved by owned users that have purchased it prior to March 2023, and WayForward itself.

References

External links
 
 

2011 video games
DSiWare games
Nintendo DS-only games
Nintendo DS games
Puzzle video games
Video games scored by Jake Kaufman
Video games developed in the United States
Video games featuring female protagonists
Video games set on fictional planets
WayForward games
Single-player video games